Sam Healy is an Australian actress most known for her work portraying Jazmina Hillerman on All Saints, an Australian hospital drama. She has also acted as an extended guest regular on  Blue Heelers and McLeod's Daughters and as a series regular on Sammy J & Randy in Ricketts Lane. She was a series regular in the Canadian television series, BeastMaster in season 2 as the demon, Iara, and in the US TV series "Monarch Cove".

Healy is sometimes credited as "Samantha".

Filmography

Film

Television

References

External links 

Australian television actresses
Living people
1976 births